Euthyone theodula is a moth of the subfamily Arctiinae. It is found in Guatemala and Honduras.

References

 Natural History Museum Lepidoptera generic names catalog

Lithosiini